John Rushout, 1st Baron Northwick (23 July 1738 – 20 October 1800) was a British politician and Member of Parliament (MP) for Evesham.

Rushout was the son of Sir John Rushout, 4th Baronet and Lady Anne Compton, and was educated at Eton and Christ Church, Oxford, which he entered in 1756.  In 1761 he was elected as Member of Parliament (MP) for Evesham and held the seat until 1796.  Politically, he was Whig until about 1789 when he went over to William Pitt the Younger and hence sat as a Tory.

He succeeded to the Rushout Baronetcy of Milnst, Essex, in 1775 and became 1st Baron Northwick of Northwick Park in the county of Worcester in 1797. He became a Fellow of the Society of Antiquaries (F.S.A.) in 1799.

Marriage and issue

He married Rebecca Bowles (b.1740) on 3 June 1766 at Wanstead, Essex.

They had five children:
 Hon. Harriet Rushout (d.30 Oct 1851) m. Sir Charles Cockerell
 Hon. Anne Rushout (d.4 Apr 1849)
 John Rushout, 2nd Baron Northwick (b.16 Feb 1770, d. 20 Jan 1859)
 Reverend Hon. George Rushout-Bowles (b.30 Jul 1772, d.Oct 1842) m. Lady Caroline Stewart, daughter of John Stewart, 7th Earl of Galloway. Their son George became the 3rd Baron Northwick.
 Hon. Elizabeth Rushout (b.1774, d.15 Jan 1862).

He died in 1800 aged sixty-two and was buried at Blockley, Worcestershire. His tomb was designed and built by Peter Matthias Van Gelder.

Lady Northwick died on 3 October 1818 at Northwick Park.

References

Oxford Dictionary of National Biography
 Romney Sedgwick History of Parliament:The Commons - 1754–1790, HMSO

1738 births
1800 deaths
People educated at Eton College
Alumni of Christ Church, Oxford
1
Peers of Great Britain created by George III
Members of the Parliament of Great Britain for English constituencies
British MPs 1761–1768
British MPs 1768–1774
British MPs 1774–1780
British MPs 1780–1784
British MPs 1784–1790
British MPs 1790–1796
Fellows of the Society of Antiquaries of London